La Razón is a Mexican regional daily newspaper in the state of Nuevo León, which was founded in 1979.

History
La Razón was founded in Cadereyta, Nuevo León, on July 29, 1979. The newspaper was founded by Francisco Tijerina González, and Francisco Cerda Muñoz. The newspaper in Tabloid format, measuring 37.5 cm x 28.3 cm, observed a print run of 5000 copies. Its economic model is based on advertising.

Redesign
In October 2011, La Razón launched a redesign that covered both the printed newspaper and the creation of an Internet site. The newspaper also became a weekly publication.

References

Razon
Newspapers